Arctosa fulvolineata is a wolf spider species in the genus Arctosa found in Europe, Mallorca and North Africa.

Habitat
Saltmarsh. A. fulvolineata is found under debris and stones at the top of saltmarshes, under lumps of mud and wet, tightly matted debris along the foot of the sea wall and under stones on the wet mud on the nearby marshes.

Distribution

UK
In the UK the species is mainly confined to a few saltmarshes around the Solent and in Langstone Harbour on the south coast, and from the coasts of north Kent, Essex and Suffolk. There is also a recently confirmed record from the Taw estuary in North Devon

Rest of Europe
Elsewhere in Europe it has been recorded from France, Spain, Portugal, Italy and Corsica.

See also
 List of Lycosidae species

References

fulvolineata
Spiders of Europe
Fauna of Mallorca
Spiders of Africa
Spiders described in 1846